The Aikido World Championships is a tournament organized by the style of Tomiki Aikido or Shodokan Aikido following the wishes of its founder Tomiki Kenji. Although, the competition itself is open for all practitioners regardless of style, competitors are predominantly Tomiki Aikido or Shodokan members. Events are split into Embu (Kata) and Randori, as well as team events, with some events being specific to Kyu or Dan grades. 
The competition is held in a different location every two years. The most recent events include Tokyo in 2005; Ohio in 2007; Kyoto in 2009; London in 2011, and Osaka for SAF members and Kawasaki City for (JAA) members in 2013.

Locations

Current Events

For the 2013 Aikido World Championships, there are 8 different events. These include Embu, Randori and Team Events: SFA and JAA

Previous Events

This consisted of 5 events: Koryu Goshin no kata suwari waza; Koryu Goshin no kata tachi waza; Women's Tanto Taisabaki; Men's Toshu Randori; Men's Tanto Randori. This was introduced at the 2001 Maishima Tournament.

References

External links
 Shodokan Aikido International Headquarters Official Site
 Japanese Aikido Association Official Site

Aikido
Shodokan Aikido